Botond is a Hungarian masculine given name and may refer to:
Botond Antal (born 1991), Hungarian footballer
Botond Baráth (born 1992), Hungarian footballer
Botond Birtalan (born 1989), Hungarian footballer
Botond Bognar, American architect 
Botond Előd (born 1984), Hungarian actor
Botond Kardos (born 1997), Hungarian gymnast
Botond Király (born 1994), Hungarian footballer
Botond Roska (born 1969), Hungarian neuroscientist
Botond Storcz (born 1975), Hungarian sprint canoeist

References

Hungarian masculine given names